Different Kind of Free is the third studio album from Christian girl group ZOEgirl. It was released on September 16, 2003 through Sparrow Records and was produced by Lynn Nichols, Robert "Aurel M" Marvin, Damon Riley and Tedd T. "You Get Me", "Beautiful Name" and "Feel Alright" were released as radio singles. Different Kind of Free marks the band's departure from the bubblegum pop music of their two previous albums, in favor of a pop rock sound.

Background

ZOEgirl's Mix of Life was released on September 24, 2002.  This remix album's Trip Rock Mix of "I Believe" foreshadowed the girl group's transition from bubblegum pop music to pop rock music.

During the autumn of 2002, Chrissy Conway-Katina started working on a draft for the lead single "You Get Me" with her future husband James Katina.  Its chorus remained the same in the finished version of the song.

On February 2, 2003, an animated banner appeared on ZOEgirl's official website, encouraging visitors to "listen to the [Trip Rock] remix" of ZOEgirl's hit single "I Believe".  Those who participated in this activity were instructed to listen to the original, pop version of "I Believe".  Afterwards, they listened to the Trip Rock remix of "I Believe".  Finally, they would comment on the remix, indicating whether or not they enjoyed it.

The album's official release date was announced on May 22, 2003 via the group's official website. "You Get Me" was released to radio stations on June 22, 2003. On July 15, 2003, ZOEgirl announced the album's title: Different Kind of Free.  The lead single "You Get Me" was released to retail stores on July 24, 2003.

Release
Different Kind of Free peaked on the Billboard 200 at No. 149. It reached No. 9 on Billboards Christian Albums chart, and No. 4 on the Billboard Top Heatseekers Chart.

Reception
Despite the girl group's musical transition, the album received generally favorable reviews among Christian music critics. Jesus Freak Hideout stated in their review: "ZOEgirl strips away the electronic sugar and spice to offer up the smoothest transition from pop to pop/rock since Rebecca St. James made the same move in the mid-nineties." CCM Magazine said that "No.  offers plenty of good advice on ways to be different and, in this case, godly kinds of girls."

Track listing

 Personnel ZOEgirl Alisa Childers – vocals, additional guitars (5, 8), BGV arrangements 
 Chrissy Conway – vocals, additional percussion (5), BGV arrangements 
 Kristin Swinford – vocals, additional guitars (5), BGV arrangements Additional musicians Tedd T – programming (1-9, 11), bass guitar (1, 3-7, 9, 11), additional BGV arrangements
 Damon Riley – programming (1-9, 11)
 Rusty Varenkamp – additional programming (1-9, 11), additional vocal arrangements 
 Robert "Aurel M" Marvin – all instruments except electric guitar (10)
 Lynn Nichols – electric guitars, acoustic guitars (1-9, 11), additional vocal arrangements 
 David May – additional guitars (2)
 James Katina – bass guitar (2), additional backing vocals (2)
 Brent Milligan – bass guitar (4, 8)
 Dan Needham – drums (1-9, 11)
 Antonio Neal – additional backing vocals (2)
 Mat Kearney – rap (10)Production'
 Lynn Nichols – executive producer, producer (5)
 Tedd T – producer (1-9, 11), recording, editing, mixing (1-9, 11)
 Damon Riley – additional production (1-9, 11), additional recording
 Aurel M – producer (10)
 James Baird – additional recording, drum recording, mixing (1-4, 7)
 Rusty Varenkamp – additional recording, editing 
 Allen Salmon – drum recording assistant, editing
 F. Reid Shippen – mixing (10)
 Lee Bridges – mix assistant (10)
 Richard Dodd – mastering 
 Jan Cook – art direction 
 Beth Lee – photographic direction 
 Alexis Goodman – graphic design 
 Kristin Barlowe – photography 
 Brian Smoot – make-up
 Giovanni Guliano – hair stylist 
 Christiév Carothers – stylist

References

2003 albums
ZOEgirl albums
Sparrow Records albums